Siege of Hama may refer to:

 Battle of Hamath
 1964 Hama riot
 1982 Hama massacre
 Siege of Hama (2011)